De-Excluded Area Rajanpur is a tehsil located in Rajanpur District, Punjab, Pakistan. The population is 34,230 according to the 2017 census.

See also 
 List of tehsils of Punjab, Pakistan

References 

Tehsils of Punjab, Pakistan
Rajanpur District